Neha Pawar (born 2 March 1991) is an Indian actress who predominantly appears in Bollywood films. She has also appeared in a Punjabi film. She is known for her films Paranthe Wali Gali (2014)  and Thoda Lutf Thoda Ishq (2015). She is going to appear as main lead actress in the Punjabi Movie Kirdar-E-Sardar. She played leading role in Asees.

References

External links

 
 
 
 

1991 births
Living people
Indian film actresses
Actresses in Hindi cinema
21st-century Indian actresses